Chromosome 17 open reading frame 67 is a protein that in humans is encoded by the C17orf67 gene.

References

Further reading